The Man Who is a 1921 American silent comedy film. Directed by Maxwell Karger, the film stars Bert Lytell, Lucy Cotton, and Virginia Valli. It was released on July 4, 1921.

Cast
 Bert Lytell as Bedford Mills
 Lucy Cotton as Helen Jessop
 Virginia Valli as Mary Turner
 Frank Currier as St. John Jessop
 Tammany Young as Shorty Mulligan
 Fred Warren as Bud Carter
 Clarence Elmer as Radford Haynes
 William Roselle as Bing Horton
 Mary Louise Beaton as Sarah Butler
 Frank R. Strayer as Jack Hyde (credited as Frank Strayer)

Preservation status
 A print of the film was preserved by MGM.

References

American silent feature films
American black-and-white films
Films based on short fiction
Films directed by Maxwell Karger
Silent American comedy films
1921 comedy films
1921 films
Metro Pictures films
1920s English-language films
1920s American films